The  is an arcade system developed and produced by Nintendo from 1984 to 1990. It is based on most of the same hardware as the Family Computer (Famicom), later released as the Nintendo Entertainment System (NES). Most of its games are conversions from the Famicom and NES, some heavily altered for the arcade format, and some debuted on the VS. System before being released on the Famicom or NES. The system focuses on two-player cooperative play. It was released in three different configurations: upright VS. UniSystem cabinets, upright VS. DualSystem cabinets, and sit-down VS. DualSystem cabinets. Games are on pluggable circuit boards, allowing for each side to have a different game.

The VS. System was a commercial success in the United States, with about 100,000 arcade cabinets sold, as the highest-grossing arcade machine of 1985. It was the first version of the Famicom hardware to debut in North America, in 1984. The system's success in the arcades proved the market for the official release of the NES console in North America in 1985.

Hardware
The VS. System was designed primarily as a kit to retrofit Donkey Kong, Donkey Kong Jr., Donkey Kong 3, Popeye, and Mario Bros. cabinets, so they require the same special monitor. These monitors use inverse voltage levels for their video signals as compared to most arcade monitors.

Almost all VS. System cabinets have identical hardware powered by a Ricoh 2A03 central processing unit (CPU), the same in the Nintendo Entertainment System, except for special PPUs or video chips. Each chip contains a different palette that arrange the colors in different configurations chosen apparently at random. Most boards can be switched to a new game simply by swapping the program ROMs and the appropriate PPU or the game will have incorrect colors. Several of the later units employ further copy protection by using special PPUs which swap pairs of I/O registers or return special data from normally unimplemented regions of memory.  Attempts to run these games in other VS. System models will result in the game failing to even start.

Some dedicated double cabinets look like two games butted together at an angle, with a single motherboard. The Red Tent, a steel sit-down cabinet for the VS. DualSystem, allows play for up to four players simultaneously. It has the same motherboard as the double cabinet.

Because the VS. System has the same CPU as the NES, its games can be ported to the NES with modifications to the console including extra memory banks and additional DIP switches.

Version differences

Some games differ from their Famicom or NES versions. For example, VS. Super Mario Bros. is considerably more difficult than Super Mario Bros.; some of the levels were reused in Super Mario Bros. 2 for the Family Computer Disk System. Some games' graphics differ; for example, VS. Duck Hunt has more details and animation sequences.

History
In 1980, Data East had introduced the concept of a convertible arcade system board, or arcade conversion system, with the DECO Cassette System, but it was not a major success. The first successful arcade conversion system is Sega's Convert-a-Game system in the early 1980s. Its success led to several other arcade manufacturers introducing their own arcade conversion systems by the mid-1980s, including the Nintendo VS. System in 1984.

The Nintendo VS. System is important in the history of the Nintendo Entertainment System. The Vs. System is the first version of the Famicom hardware to debut in North America during 1984, the success of which proved the market for the official release of the NES console. Following the video game crash of 1983, the North American home video game market had collapsed. Nintendo's negotiations with Atari to introduce the Famicom in North America failed due to Atari's collapse, and Nintendo of America's market research garnered warnings from retailers and distributors to stay away from home consoles, with US retailers refusing to stock game consoles. Meanwhile, the arcade game industry also had a slump as the golden age of arcade video games ended, but the arcade industry recovered and stabilized with the help of software conversion kit systems, such as Sega's Convert-a-Game system, the Atari System 1, and the Nintendo-Pak system. Hiroshi Yamauchi realized there was still a market for video games in North America, where players were gradually returning to arcades in significant numbers. Yamauchi still had faith there was a market for the Famicom, so he introduced it to North America through the arcade industry.

Nintendo based the VS. System hardware on the Famicom, and introduced it as the successor to its Nintendo-Pak arcade system, which had been used for games such as Mario Bros. and Donkey Kong 3. Though technologically weaker than Nintendo's Punch-Out arcade hardware, the VS. System was relatively inexpensive, fulfilling Gunpei Yokoi's philosophy of "lateral thinking with withered technology". The Nintendo-Pak and Punch-Out hardware also have a limited game library, whereas the VS. System accessed a wider variety of games, by easily converting Famicom games. Nintendo of America hired Jeff Walker from Bally to help market the VS. System in North America, where it debuted at the 1984 ASI show along with Punch-Out in February 1984.

Reception
Upon release, the VS. System generated excitement in the arcade industry, receiving praise for its easy conversions, affordability, flexibility, and multiplayer capabilities. Eddie Adlum of RePlay magazine said Nintendo had suddenly become "the big guy on the block" in 1984 due to the VS. System, which "not only meant interchangeable games but interaction between players on dual-monitor games". However, the graphics received a mixed response. Roger C. Sharpe of Play Meter magazine called it a "highly attractive and open-ended interchangeable game system featuring excellent graphics and realistic on-screen visuals" in 1984. However, the VS. System received some criticism for its graphics being technologically weaker than more recent rival arcade systems, and than Nintendo's own powerful Punch-Out arcade hardware.

In Japan, VS. Tennis topped Japan's chart for table arcade cabinets in April 1984 and May 1984, and VS. Baseball topped the chart in June and July 1984. By 1985, however, the VS. System had declined in Japan, which led to Yamauchi deciding to withdraw Nintendo from the Japanese coin-op industry in late 1985 and Nintendo focusing more on the Famicom.

In North America, by contrast, the VS. System became a major success. Following the arcade success of sports video games such as Konami's Track & Field (1983), Nintendo capitalized on this trend with several sports games (Punch-Out, Vs. Tennis and Vs. Baseball) that took the US arcade market by storm; Sharpe considered Nintendo "a force to reckon with" based on their strong performance. The VS. System was declared an "overwhelming hit" by Play Meter, attributing its success to "good games and low price". Between 10,000 and 20,000 arcade cabinets were sold in 1984, and individual Vs. games were top earners on arcade charts. VS. Tennis topped the arcade charts for software conversion kits in July 1984 (on the RePlay charts) and August 1984 (on the Play Meter charts), and VS. Baseball topped the charts from September through November 1984. Hogan's Alley and Duck Hunt then became even more popular in American arcades, popularizing light gun shooter video games. By 1985, 50,000 cabinets had been sold, establishing Nintendo as an industry leader in the arcades. In November 1985, five VS. games were on the US RePlay top 20 arcade charts, with Hogan's Alley holding the top spot. Duck Hunt was also popular in arcades at the time. The VS. System went on to become the highest-grossing arcade machine of 1985 in the United States, and Hogan's Alley and Excitebike became the top two highest-grossing arcade system games that year.

The success of the VS. System gave Nintendo the confidence to  repackage the Famicom for North America, as the Nintendo Entertainment System (NES). Nintendo's strong positive reputation in the arcades also generated significant interest in the NES. It also gave Nintendo the opportunity to test new games as VS. Paks in the arcades, to determine which games to release for the  NES launch. Nintendo's software strategy was to first release games for the Famicom, then the VS. System, and then for the NES. This allowed Nintendo to build a solid launch line-up for the NES. Many games' North American debut was on the VS. System before being released for the NES, which gave players the impression of being "amazed" at the accuracy of the arcade "ports" for the NES.

Within a few months of its 1986 release, 20,000 VS. Its arcade success helped introduce Super Mario Bros. to many players who did not yet own a Nintendo Entertainment System. By the time the NES was launched in North America (from late 1985 to 1986), about 100,000 VS. Systems had been sold to American arcades. According to Ken Horowitz, the VS. System "was perhaps the most vital catalyst in the rise of the NES to the top of the home video game market".

List of games
Unknown prototypes of VS. System games may exist, either unreleased or released briefly for market testing. The VS. System launch game was VS. Tennis, released in January 1984.

See also
PlayChoice-10, Nintendo's other NES-based arcade series
Nintendo Super System, the Super NES-based arcade system
Wild Gunman (1984), which had a fictional VS. arcade version featured in the film Back to the Future Part II (1989)

Notes

References

External links
NintendoVS.com fan site
 
Nintendo VS. System Games and Accessories : PAR Playchoice-10 Games and Resources

Nintendo arcade system boards
Nintendo Entertainment System

Nintendo hardware
1984 establishments
1990 disestablishments